Feyziyeh Rural District is a rural district (dehestan) in the Central District of Babol County, Mazandaran Province, Iran. At the 2006 census, its population was 24,073, in 6,210 families. The rural district has 33 villages.

References 

Rural Districts of Mazandaran Province
Babol County